Paul Christopher Sturgess (born 4 August 1975 in Dartford) is an English former footballer who played as a left back in the Football League for Charlton Athletic, Millwall and Brighton & Hove Albion, and in the Conference for Hereford United, Stevenage Borough and Gravesend & Northfleet.

References

External links
 

1975 births
Living people
Sportspeople from Dartford
English footballers
Association football defenders
Charlton Athletic F.C. players
Millwall F.C. players
Brighton & Hove Albion F.C. players
Hereford United F.C. players
Stevenage F.C. players
Ebbsfleet United F.C. players
English Football League players
National League (English football) players